Cagliostro is a 1975 Italian biographical-drama film directed by Daniele Pettinari. Loosely based on the real life events of Alessandro Cagliostro, the film has many historical  inaccuracies, including the claim that Giuseppe Balsamo and Cagliostro were two different persons.

Cast 
 Bekim Fehmiu: Cagliostro / Giuseppe Balsamo
 Curd Jürgens: Cardinal Giovanni Angelo Braschi, future Pope Pius VI
 Rosanna Schiaffino: Lorenza Balsamo 
 Evelyn Stewart: Serafina Cagliostro 
 Luigi Pistilli: Cardinal Louis-René-Édouard de Rohan-Guéménée
 Robert Alda: Pope Clement XIII
 Massimo Girotti: Giacomo Casanova 
 Anna Orso: the Queen
 Alessandro Haber

References

External links

1975 films
1970s biographical drama films
Italian biographical drama films
Films set in the 18th century
Films about Alessandro Cagliostro
1970s historical drama films
Italian historical drama films
1970s Italian-language films
1975 directorial debut films
1975 drama films
Films scored by Manuel De Sica
1970s Italian films